Kenneth D. Moelis (born 1958) is an American billionaire investment banker, and founder of Moelis & Company, an investment banking firm.

Early life and education
Moelis was born in 1958, the son of Gaye (née Gross) and Herbert I. Moelis, president of Equity Leasing Corporation, an office equipment company in New York, of which his grandfather, Paul I. Gross was its retired president. His father is also a breeder of thoroughbred race horses at his CandyLand Stables in Middletown, Delaware. Moelis holds a Bachelor of Science in Economics and a Masters of Business Administration from the Wharton School of the University of Pennsylvania.

Career
Moelis began his career at Drexel Burnham Lambert in 1981 where he would ultimately serve as a managing director working for Michael Milken in the firm's Los Angeles office. Following the collapse of Drexel, Moelis left with a portion of his team to join Donaldson Lufkin & Jenrette where he served as head of its corporate finance investment banking division. Under Moelis, DLJ emerged as a prominent investment banking firm in Los Angeles in the 1990s.

Following the acquisition of DLJ by Credit Suisse First Boston in 2000, Moelis was named head of US investment banking of the combined firm in September 2000. However, his tenure at CSFB would be short, announcing his departure for UBS (then known as UBS Warburg) just months later taking the core of his team with him, including a number that would later join Moelis & Company. Moelis recruited more than 70 senior investment bankers to UBS within three months of his arrival.

In his six years at UBS, Moelis ultimately assumed the role of president of UBS Investment Bank and was credited with the build-out of UBS's investment banking operation in the United States. By the end of 2006, UBS was ranked Top 4 in the global fee pool for the first time.

Moelis founded Moelis & Company along with several fellow senior UBS investment bankers that included Navid Mahmoodzadegan, Jeff Raich, John Momtazee, Todd Wadler, Elizabeth Crain and Warren Woo.

Other affiliations
Moelis received both his undergraduate degree and MBA from The Wharton School at the University of Pennsylvania in 1981. Today he is a member of the Wharton board of overseers. Moelis is chairman of the Tourette Association of America and is on the board of governors of Cedars Sinai Hospital. Moelis is a member of the Hillcrest Country Club. In 2011, 2014, and 2016, he was included in the 50 Most Influential ranking of Bloomberg Markets magazine.

Personal life
In 1983, Moelis married Julie Lynn Taffet in a Jewish ceremony at the Sephardic Temple in Cedarhurst, New York. His sister, Cindy S. Moelis, was appointed director of the Presidential Commission on White House Fellows and is married to Robert S. Rivkin who was appointed by President Barack Obama as the 21st General Counsel of the United States Department of Transportation (DOT)

References

External links
 The dealer's got a hot hand. Los Angeles Business Journal, October 21, 1991
 Ken Moelis Waits for Bat Phone to Ring as Wall Street Rebounds. Bloomberg, August 10, 2009
 The Networker:. Dealmaker, April/May 2008
 Check Your Premises: An Objectivist's View of the Modern World. Adam Smith Institute YouTube Channel, December 2, 2015
 Drexel's Heir. Fortune, April 14, 19967

1958 births
Living people
American investment bankers
Jewish American bankers
Drexel Burnham Lambert
UBS people
Wharton School of the University of Pennsylvania alumni
Objectivists
American billionaires
Moelis family
American company founders